SK Blāzma was a Men's Highest Floorball League of Latvia team based in Rēzekne, Latvia.

Goaltenders
  1  Valdis Jukna
  2  Deniss Višņakovs
16  Valērijs Bodnieks
55  Alesis Cibanjuks

Defencemen
  6  Vitālijs Terezkins
  7  Romāns Gemma
  9  Dairis Dikuļs-Dikaļs
14  Ēriks Čate
25  Artūrs Satkuns
68  Jurijs Ivenkovs
86  Intars Bērziņš

Forwards
  8  Andrejs Cvetkovs
10  Igors Kalnačs
11  Maksims Terehovs
12  Aleksandrs Kotovs
14  Ēriks Čate
15  Pavel Semenov
20  Viktors Počkajevs
21  Deniss Kotovs
22  Valeriy Maslov
30  Roman Druzhininskiy
33  Aleksandrs Grehovs
77  Evgenijs Saveļjevs
99  Valērijs Brīvers

References
 SK Blāzma official web site

Rēzekne
Floorball in Latvia
Latvian floorball teams